FC Fortuna Mytishchi was a Russian football team from Mytishchi. It played professionally in the Russian Second Division for one season in 2006, coming in 12th in the West Zone.

External links
  Team history by footballfacts

Association football clubs established in 2003
Association football clubs disestablished in 2009
Defunct football clubs in Russia
Football in Moscow Oblast
2003 establishments in Russia
2009 disestablishments in Russia